This is a comprehensive list of songs by German rock band Tokio Hotel. Since forming in 2001, by the name of Devilish, the band have released seven studio albums, two live albums and two compilation albums . This list does not contain live versions or remixes released by the band.

Original songs

Other appearances

Tokio Hotel